The 1967–68 La Liga was the 37th season since its establishment. It started on September 9, 1967, and finished on April 28, 1968.

Team locations

League table

Results

Relegation play–offs 

|}

Pichichi Trophy

External links 
  Official LFP Site

1967 1968
1967–68 in Spanish football leagues
Spain